Worthington may refer to:

People
 Worthington (surname)
 Worthington family, a British noble family

Businesses 
 Worthington Brewery, also known as Worthington's
 Worthington Corporation, founded as a pump manufacturer in 1845, later a diversified manufacturer, merged into Studebaker-Worthington in 1967
 Worthington Industries, a metals manufacturing company founded in 1955

Places

Canada
Worthington, Ontario

England
Worthington, Greater Manchester
Worthington, Leicestershire

United States
Worthington, Indiana
Worthington, Iowa
Worthington, Kentucky
Worthington, Louisville, Kentucky, a neighborhood
Worthington, Massachusetts
Worthington, Minnesota, in Nobles County
Worthington Township, Nobles County, Minnesota
Worthington, Missouri
Worthington, Ohio, in Franklin County
Worthington Township, Richland County, Ohio
Worthington, Pennsylvania
Worthington, West Virginia

Other 
 Worthington, a clothing line from J. C. Penney
 Worthington College, a fictional school in the television show Dawson's Creek
 Worthington Peak, a mountain in Nevada

See also
 Worthing (disambiguation)
 Workington (disambiguation)